The following highways are numbered 534:

United States